Oijen en Teeffelen was a municipality in the Dutch province of North Brabant. It included the villages of Oijen and Teeffelen.

The municipality existed until 1939, when it became part of Lith.

References

Former municipalities of North Brabant
Oss